Victoria Day is a federal Canadian public holiday celebrated on the last Monday preceding May 25. Initially in honour of Queen Victoria's birthday, it has since been celebrated as the official birthday of Canada's sovereign. It is informally considered to be the beginning of the summer season in Canada.

The holiday has been observed in Canada since at least 1845, originally falling on Victoria's actual birthday (May 24). The holiday has always been a distinctly Canadian observance and continues to be celebrated across the country.

Victoria Day is a federal statutory holiday, as well as a holiday in six of Canada's ten provinces and all three of its territories. In 2003, provincial legislation officially created National Patriots' Day on the same date.

History
The birthday of Queen Victoria was a day for celebration in Canada long before Confederation, with the first legislation in this regard being passed in 1845 by the parliament of the Province of Canada to officially recognize May 24 as the Queen's birthday. It was noted that on that date in 1854, the 35th birthday of Queen Victoria, some 5,000 residents of Canada West gathered in front of Government House (near present-day King and Simcoe Streets in Toronto) to "give cheers to their queen". An example of a typical 19th century celebration of the Queen's birthday took place on May 24, 1866, in Omemee, also in Canada West: the town mounted a day-long fête to mark the occasion, including a gun salute at midnight, pre-dawn serenades, picnics, athletic competitions, a display of illuminations, and a torch-light procession; such events were common around the colony and, by the 1890s, the day had become a "patriotic holiday".

Following the death of Queen Victoria in 1901, May 24 was made a legal holiday to be known as "Victoria Day", a date to remember the late queen, who was deemed the "Mother of Confederation", and, in 1904, the same date was by imperial decree made Empire Day throughout the British Empire. Over the ensuing decades, the official date in Canada of the reigning sovereign's birthday changed through various royal proclamations until the haphazard format was abandoned in 1952. That year, both Empire Day and Victoria Day were, by order-in-council and statutory amendment, respectively, moved to the Monday before May 25 and the monarch's official birthday in Canada was by regular viceregal proclamations made to fall on this same date every year between 1953 and January 31, 1957, when the link was made permanent by royal proclamation. The following year, Empire Day was renamed Commonwealth Day and in 1977 it was moved to the second Monday in March, leaving the Monday before May 25 as both Victoria Day and the sovereign's official birthday.

Victoria Day celebrations have been marred by major tragedy at least twice: In 1881, the passenger ferry Victoria overturned in the Thames River, near London, Ontario. The boat departed in the evening with 600 to 800 people on board—three times the allowable passenger capacity—and capsized part way across the river, drowning some 182 individuals, including a large number of children who had been with their families for Victoria Day picnics at Springbank Park. The event came to be known as the "Victoria Day disaster". Then, on May 26, 1896, the Point Ellice Bridge disaster occurred in Victoria, British Columbia, when a bridge collapsed under the weight of a streetcar overloaded with passengers on their way to attend Victoria Day celebrations.

In 2013, a group of prominent Canadian actors, authors, and politicians sent a petition to Prime Minister Stephen Harper, requesting that the holiday be renamed "Victoria and First Peoples Day".

Provincial and territorial legislation

Most workplaces in Canada are regulated by the provincial or territorial governments. Therefore, although Victoria Day is a statutory holiday for federal purposes, whether an employee is entitled to a paid day off generally depends on the province or territory of residence (with the exception of employees in federally regulated workplaces such as banks).

The status of Victoria Day in each of the provinces and territories is as follows: It is a general holiday in Alberta, Manitoba, the Northwest Territories, and Yukon and is a statutory holiday in British Columbia, Ontario, and Saskatchewan. Victoria Day is not a paid public holiday in Newfoundland and Labrador, but is a government holiday; Nova Scotia, where it is also not a designated retail closing day, but is considered a "non-statutory holiday"; and Prince Edward Island, although provincial legislation defines "holiday" to include Victoria Day.

In Nunavut and New Brunswick, the date is set as a general holiday (for New Brunswick, a prescribed day of rest on which retail businesses must be closed) to mark the reigning sovereign's official birthday. In 2003, the National Assembly of Quebec named it National Patriots' Day, commemorating the patriotes of the Lower Canada Rebellion of 1837.

Practice
Canada is the only country that commemorates Queen Victoria with an official holiday. Federal government protocol dictates that, on Victoria Day, the Royal Union Flag is to be flown from sunrise to sunset at all federal government buildingsincluding airports, military bases, and other Crown owned property across the countrywhere physical arrangements allow (i.e. where a second flag pole exists, as the Royal Union Flag can never displace the national flag).

Several cities hold a parade on the holiday, with the most prominent being that which has taken place since 1898 in the monarch's namesake city of Victoria, British Columbia. In nearby New Westminster, the Victoria Day weekend is distinguished by the Hyack Anvil Battery Salute, a tradition created during colonial times as a surrogate for a 21-gun salute: Gunpowder is placed between two anvils, the top one upturned, and the charge is ignited, hurling the upper anvil into the air. Other celebrations include an evening fireworks show, such as that held at Ashbridge's Bay Beach in the east end of Toronto, and at Ontario Place, in the same city.

In Ottawa, the traditional Trooping the Colour ceremony takes place on Parliament Hill or at Rideau Hall on occasion. The reviewing officer in the ceremony is the monarch, with members of the Royal Family, the Governor General, the Minister of National Defence or the Chief of the Defence Staff taking the sovereign's place in their absence. The participating units in the parade include personnel of the Governor General's Foot Guards and The Canadian Grenadier Guards, both of which are part of the ad hoc Ceremonial Guard.

Across the country, Victoria Day serves as the unofficial marker of the end of the winter social season, and thus the beginning of the summer social calendar. Banff, Alberta's Sunshine Village ends its lengthy ski season on Victoria Day and, likewise, it is during this long weekend that many summer businesses—such as parks, outdoor restaurants, bicycle rentals, city tour operators, etc.—will open. Victoria Day is also a mark of the beginning of the cottage season, when cottage owners may reverse the winterization of their property. Gardeners in Canada will similarly regard Victoria Day as the beginning of spring, as it falls at a time when one can be fairly certain that frost will not return until the next autumn. There is also a change in fashion: lighter-coloured summer clothing was traditionally worn from Victoria Day through until Labour Day.

The holiday is colloquially known in parts of Canada as "May Two-Four", a double entendre that refers both to the date around which the holiday falls (May 24) and the Canadian slang for a case of twenty-four beers (a "two-four"), a drink popular during the long weekend. The holiday weekend may also be known as the "May long weekend", "May Long", or "May Run", and the term "Firecracker Day" was once employed in Ontario.

A traditional, short song about Victoria Day went as follows: "The twenty-fourth of May / Is the Queen's birthday; / If they don't give us a holiday / We'll all run away!" The holiday is referenced in the song "Lakeside Park" by Canadian rock band Rush, from their 1975 album Caress of Steel. The song features the line, "everyone would gather on the 24th of May, sitting in the sand to watch the fireworks display".

See also
 Monarchism in Canada
 Bermuda Day, a Bermudian holiday. Introduced from Canada and originally known as Victoria Day (subsequently Empire Day, Commonwealth Day and Heritage Day), Bermuda Day is celebrated on the Friday occurring on or nearest May 24 and traditionally marks the unofficial beginning of summer
 Memorial Day, a U.S. holiday that falls on the final Monday of May also generally treated as the beginning of summer

References

External links

 Department of Canadian Heritage website entry for Victoria Day
 Victoria Day Festival

Birthdays
Birthdays of heads of state
May observances
Monarchy in Canada
Monday observances
Monuments and memorials to Queen Victoria
Public holidays in Canada
Spring (season) events in Canada
Queen Victoria